Peloton Interactive, Inc. is an American exercise equipment and media company based in New York City. The company's products are stationary bicycles, treadmills, and indoor rowers equipped with Internet-connected touch screens that stream live and on-demand fitness classes through a subscription service. The equipment includes built-in sensors that track metrics such as power output, providing users with real-time feedback on their performance and leaderboard rankings to compete with other users.

Peloton charges a US$44 monthly membership fee to access classes and additional features on their exercise equipment, or $12.99 for users only accessing the content via app or website.

History

Founding to IPO 
In 2011, John Foley, an executive at Barnes & Noble in New York City, pitched his colleague, Tom Cortese, on the idea that technology could make it possible for people with little time to get the full experience of working out in a high-end studio cycling class in their homes. Peloton Interactive was founded in January 2012. "Peloton" is a cycling term, meaning a large group of riders bunched together. 

The company raised $400,000 in seed money in February 2012 and another $3.5 million in December 2012. Peloton sold its first bike on Kickstarter in 2013 with an early bird price tag of $1,500. Their first Internet-connected stationary bicycle with a tablet was released in 2014. The company also opened showrooms in shopping centers around the US, for people to test out the machines, and "sales quickly soared," behind the entertaining classes and cycling instructors, and the online community of riders.

Peloton’s original treadmill, Tread+, was unveiled in January 2018 by the company at the annual Consumer Electronics Show in Las Vegas. In May 2018, Peloton announced plans to expand into Canada and the United Kingdom that fall. It also announced construction of a flagship studio at Manhattan West in New York City.

In March 2019, Peloton was sued by the National Music Publishers Association for using copyrighted music in their videos without proper synchronization licenses, seeking $150 million in damages. The action resulted in changes to music used in its sessions, as well as removal of certain programs that used the songs named in the suit. In September 2019, the suit was amended and increased to $300 million. Peloton settled the lawsuit in February 2020; financial terms were not disclosed.

On September 26, 2019, Peloton became a public company via an initial public offering, raising $1.16 billion and valuing the company at $8.1 billion. After reaching a market valuation of $50 billion in January 2021, the company's valuation was back to around $8 billion by April 2022.

The Gift That Gives Back ad 
In November 2019, the company released a new holiday commercial, "The Gift That Gives Back," where a wife, played by Monica Ruiz, receives a Peloton bike for Christmas from her husband, and, after using it, observes that she "didn't realize how much this would change me." The commercial received criticism from viewers who claimed that its plot implied that the woman's husband was dissatisfied with her physical appearance. 

Peloton defended the ad, arguing that it was intended to celebrate a "fitness and wellness journey", inspired by how its users were often "meaningfully and positively impacted after purchasing or being gifted a Peloton Bike or Tread, often in ways that surprise them." Ruiz, the actress that played the wife, was hired for an ad titled "The Gift That Doesn't Give Back" for Aviation American Gin, released in December 2019, which lightly mocked the Peloton ad.

COVID-19 pandemic through 2021 
Sales increased significantly during the COVID-19 pandemic as home gyms became more popular during the COVID-19 lockdowns. However, the rapid increase in demand caused shipping delays, with customers receiving their products months late, leading some to cancel orders. In December 2020, the company made a $100 million investment in shipping solutions in an attempt to accelerate manufacturing and decrease shipping times.

Flywheel Sports lawsuit settlement 
Due to Peloton's success, at least a dozen rivals, including Equinox, Icon Health & Fitness, and Flywheel Sports, began selling Peloton-style internet-connected bikes. In February 2020, Flywheel ceased its at-home cycling services after settling with Peloton over a patent lawsuit. Flywheel created its at-home internet-connected bike in 2017, and later admitted it illegally copied Peloton's technology. Court documents revealed that Flywheel created an internal initiative to obtain Peloton's confidential trade information. After Flywheel's service shut down, Peloton offered Flywheel users the opportunity to exchange their Flywheel bikes for refurbished Peloton bikes at no cost.

Tread and Tread+ safety recall 
In May 2021, the U.S. Consumer Product Safety Commission warned people with children and pets to immediately stop using the Tread+ model of Peloton treadmill, after one child died after being pulled under the treadmill while a parent was running on it, and almost 40 others sustained injuries including fractured bones. The commission stated that when not in use, the product should be stored in a locked room to prevent children and pets from accessing it.

Peloton initially rejected the Consumer Product Safety Commission's request to recall the product and instead warned parents to keep children away from the treadmill, before it changed course and voluntarily recalled the Tread and Tread+ on May 5, 2021. The Tread model was also recalled due to reports of the touchscreen display screws loosening, causing the screen to occasionally detach and fall off. In July 2021, a Brooklyn couple filed a lawsuit for unspecified damages against the company claiming their 3-year-old son suffered third-degree burns after being trapped under the treadmill.

As part of the recall, Peloton allows consumers to return the treadmills for a full refund until November 6, 2022. In August 2021, Peloton announced that Tread owners could schedule an in-home appointment for their treadmill's touchscreen to get repaired by a technician. Later that month, Peloton enacted safety features including the Tread Lock digital passcode to unlock the Tread, and a safety key that must be in place in order to begin use. The feature locks the treadmill after inactivity and requires a four-digit passcode to unlock.

Sex and the City plot point 
In December 2021, on the first episode of the Sex and the City reboot And Just Like That..., the character Mr. Big (played by Chris Noth) has a heart attack and dies after riding a Peloton bike. The day after the initial airing of the episode, Peloton shares fell 11.3%. The company issued a statement through Dr. Suzanne Steinbaum, a cardiologist and member of the company's health and wellness advisory, saying that they agreed to the product placement but were not aware of how it would be used in the pivotal scene.

The statement also said not to blame the company for the character's death, and cited some contributing factors, such as his lifestyle (e.g., his consumption of steaks and cigars) and a cardiac surgery in a previous season. The company released an ad, narrated by Ryan Reynolds, with Reynolds citing the benefits of cycling and ending with, "He's alive." The ad was removed after Noth was accused of sexual assault by two women. 

Several weeks later, an episode of the show Billions also featured a character experiencing a heart attack after using a Peloton device.

Stock turbulence and CEO change 
In January 2022, CNBC reported, citing internal company documents, that Peloton had temporarily paused production of its products after greatly increased demand during the early stages of the COVID pandemic had slackened, leaving the company with a glut of bikes and treadmills. The company denied the report. Peloton's share price quadrupled in 2020, before dropping nearly 80% in 2021. 

In February 2022, 2,800 employees were laid off in an effort to save $800 million annually. CEO John Foley stepped down from his position, becoming executive chairman, and was replaced by Barry McCarthy, the former chief financial officer of Spotify and Netflix. As of April 2022, Foley controls around 35% of voting power in the company.

On March 11, 2022, the company started testing a new pricing structure called One Peloton Club. Customers pay a one-time delivery fee plus a monthly fee to rent the Bike or Bike+. The monthly fee includes the bike and a subscription to access all workout classes. 

On April 14, 2022, it was reported that Peloton reduced the prices of its stationary bikes and treadmills, and would raise the price of monthly subscriptions for classes for Peloton equipment owners. Starting in the US on June 1, 2022, the company raised the price for equipment content subscriptions to $44 per month. The app membership price remained unchanged. The starting price of bikes went down from $1,745 including shipping to $1,445 including shipping, and the starting price of treadmills was lowered from $2,845 including shipping to $2,695 including shipping.

In July 2022, it was reported that Peloton would outsource the manufacturing of its stationary bikes and treadmills rather than produce them in-house. The following month, the company announced to employees it would cut some 800 jobs and begin outsourcing some roles and positions. 

In August 2022, the company announced it would start selling its bikes and gear through Amazon in order to increase the distribution of its products, a move that came after discussions of a potential takeover by Amazon or another firm. On Peloton's earnings call the same month, the company disclosed it had lost $1.2 billion in the fourth quarter. During this period, the company said that it was looking to sell used inventory. Barry McCarthy, the company's chief, referred to this as a top priority.

In September 2022, the company announced that co-founder John Foley, chief legal officer Hisao Kushi, and chief commercial officer Kevin Cornils were departing.

Products

Bike and Bike+ 
The Peloton Bikes are internet-connected stationary bicycles with a touchscreen that streams exercise classes to the rider. The device touchscreen operates on a custom version of Android. Classes can also be accessed through the Peloton App or website. Classes can be cast from the Bike to a TV using Miracast, and can be cast from the App or website to a TV using iOS and Android devices, such as AirPlay and Chromecast. Users can video chat with friends during classes. Those who purchase the Bike then pay a monthly subscription fee for access to live-streaming and on-demand classes through the tablet.

The Bike+ was introduced in September 2020. The Bike monitor is 21.5 inches in size, and is an HD touchscreen. The monitor used on the Bike+ is an HD touchscreen that is 23.8 inches and has a rotating feature. The Bike+ has an auto-resistance feature. Both have Bluetooth. Both bikes come with clip-in pedals that require cycling shoes, or users can purchase pedals that don't require cycling shoes.

Tread and Tread+ treadmills 
The Tread+ (originally named the Tread) was unveiled in January 2018 by the company at the annual Consumer Electronics Show in Las Vegas. Classes are streamed via a 32″ touchscreen and sound bar mounted at the front of the machine. The treadmill features a slatted rubber running surface, a feature that is often compared to Woodway's professional treadmills.

In September 2020, Peloton released a lower-end treadmill called the Tread. The company renamed the original treadmill the Tread+. In late 2021, Peloton added safety key and 'Tread Lock' features to the Tread to increase safety and prevent unauthorized access.

Peloton Row indoor rower 
In May 2022, Peloton teased and confirmed the forthcoming release of a indoor rowing machine at its 2022 Homecoming virtual event. In September 2022, the company announced the launch of Peloton Row, accepting pre-orders of its rowing machines for December deliveries. The Peloton Row cost $3,195.

Guide 
In November 2021, Peloton announced the Peloton Guide, a connected fitness device to stream workouts with a movement-tracking camera to study the user's movements, track their workouts, and offer feedback and recommendations for Peloton classes. It was released on April 5, 2022, priced at $295, plus an introductory price of $24 per month for the service. It features a 12-megapixel wide-angle camera and streams 4K video at up to 60 frames per second. The built-in camera allows the user to see themselves onscreen and track their exercises alongside the instructor. At the end of the workout, they are shown a body activity breakdown, highlighting the muscles they've worked. They'll also get class recommendations based on their activity. Peloton Guide connects to any television or computer monitor via HDMI, and includes a remote control.

Digital membership 
Users without Peloton exercise equipment stream all classes via a mobile app or website.  The Peloton app is available on Apple TV, Amazon Fire TV, Roku, and Android TV, which is installed onto smart TVs from Sony, Philips, and Sharp Corporation.

The digital membership costs $12.99 per month. The subscription is discounted to $6.99 for students and $9.99 for healthcare workers, first responders and teachers.

While Peloton's Bike and Bike+ bundle (which includes a bike) remains a market leader in that segment, its Digital membership faces more competition. Cyclists who want to use their own bike instead of the company's stationary bike have several alternatives at similar price points.

Class formats and features

Classes and instructors 
While Peloton's flagship offerings are cycling and running classes using their exercise machines, they also offer classes in strength training, yoga, cardio aerobic exercise, meditation, stretching, tread bootcamp, bike bootcamp, and walking. Classes are recorded daily and streamed live from instructors' homes or Peloton's cycling studios in Hudson Yards, Manhattan and London and are then uploaded to the Peloton library for on-demand access 24/7. Peloton produces up to 19 new classes a day.

Peloton also has special themed class formats like its Artist Series, which features playlists from featured musicians, including Alicia Keys, Britney Spears, and Bon Jovi. Series of classes also include charitable and celebrity collaborations, including the Our Future Selves series, featuring Ashton Kutcher, Peloton coach Becs Gentry, and Kutcher's non-profit organization, Thorn.

Some of the company's fitness instructors, including Robin Arzon and Jess King, have become celebrities and social media influencers. Peloton instructor Cody Rigsby participated on Dancing with the Stars season 30.

Interactive and gamification features 
Users can compete with one another on the live leaderboard that ranks class participants based on the Output (total wattage of energy expended). Peloton also tracks the Strive Score (based on the percentage of the maximum heart rate) using a Bluetooth heart rate monitor connected to the bike, treadmill, or phone. Unlike the Output metic, the Strive Score is non-competitive.

Users can tap someone's username on the leaderboard to give them a high five (a virtual show of encouragement).

The company first began testing a gaming-inspired workout class called Peloton Lanebreak in July 2021 and released it on Bike and Bike+ on February 17, 2022. The game is an obstacle course where players control a wheel-like avatar by pedaling along a six-lane track while using the resistance knob to change lanes and avoid obstacles. Players choose from a variety of levels with different genres of music and types of workouts at varying lengths and varying degrees of resistance. It is available as part of the All-Access membership on the Bike and Bike+.

Other products and offerings

Showrooms 

Peloton has physical retail locations where prospective customers can learn about Peloton's offerings and products, and take a trial class on the Bike or Tread. The first location was at the Mall at Short Hills in New Jersey. As of 2022, Peloton has 97 showrooms in the United States and Canada, 5 in Australia, and 39 in the United Kingdom and Germany.

Peloton Homecoming event 
The Homecoming event was originally organized by fans of the Peloton products in 2016 but, having gained the attention of the company, was adopted as a company-sanctioned event. It was held in person up to 2019 with a small-scale online fan event held in 2020.

At the beginning of June 2021, Peloton held a free online Homecoming event, consisting of three days of special classes, panel discussions on fitness and the introduction of new features and instructors. Homecoming 2022 was a two-day virtual event held on May 13-14.

Peloton studios 
Peloton has two physical locations where its classes are filmed live and streamed to users. Prior to the COVID-19 pandemic, classes were filmed live with participants at its New York and London studios.

The New York studio was moved and upgraded at a cost of $50 million in 2020.
In addition to the New York studio, classes are filmed at the London studio. The European location, which opened in 2018, also serves as the location for German-language classes with German instructors. Peloton Australia classes are filmed in the New York studio with Australian instructors. At the beginning of the COVID-19 pandemic, the studios were shut down and Peloton filmed live classes from the homes of select instructors, including those from New York and London. Peloton has announced plans to reopen its studios in New York and London in the summer of 2022.

Peloton apparel 
Peloton sells branded activewear apparel items, often with collaborations with other fitness apparel companies like Adidas. In 2021 it launched a new line entirely made from its own private label.

Product specifications

Notes

References

Further reading

External links
 

2012 establishments in New York City
2019 initial public offerings
American companies established in 2012
Manufacturing companies established in 2012
Companies listed on the Nasdaq
Exercise equipment companies
Publicly traded companies based in New York City
Subscription services
Kickstarter-funded products